= Thalassocystis =

Thalassocystis Temporal range: Silurian

Scientific classification
- Domain: Eukaryota
- (unranked): incertae sedis
- Genus: †Thalassocystis
- Species: †T. striata

Binomial name
- †Thalassocystis striata Taggart & Parker, 1976

Extinct genus of algae

Thalassocystis is an extinct genus of alga known from the Silurian period found in Michigan. It is possibly a red alga or a brown alga.
